45 or 46 Songs That Weren't Good Enough to Go on Our Other Records is a double album released in 2002 by NOFX. There were 47 songs on the CD version, and all the songs easily fit onto one CD.

The band built up a list of songs that did not make it onto any of their albums, or had previously appeared on compilation albums, vinyl singles, or b-sides. Many of these had been dropped originally because of Fat Mike's tendency to not release albums that ran for too long.

The first CD contained a collection of songs spanning almost the entirety of the band's career. The oldest track was from the band's first demo, and the newest was recorded for this album.

The second CD contained the EPs Fuck the Kids and Surfer, each of which contained 13 or so very short songs that were previously available only on 7" vinyl. Fat Mike chose to leave one song off of each of the EPs when compiling this CD, "just to annoy people a bit".

The vinyl release of the album was renamed to 22 Songs That Weren't Good Enough to Go on Our Other Records, but included only the first 21 tracks from the first CD, because of all of the second CD was already available on the two vinyl EPs.

Song information

Critical reception

AllMusic gave the album a 4 out of 5.

Track listing

Charts

References

External links

45 or 46 Songs That Weren't Good Enough to Go on Our Other Records at YouTube (streamed copy where licensed)

NOFX compilation albums
B-side compilation albums
2002 compilation albums
Fat Wreck Chords compilation albums